Automatic is the third studio album by Scottish alternative rock band the Jesus and Mary Chain, released on 9 October 1989 by Blanco y Negro Records. The group on this record consists of the core duo of brothers William and Jim Reid, with a drum machine providing percussion and synthesised bass. The only other credited musician was Richard Thomas, who joined the touring version of the Jesus and Mary Chain as a drummer. Thomas drummed on "Gimme Hell" and was a former member of Dif Juz. He also made appearances on Cocteau Twins' 1986 album Victorialand and This Mortal Coil's 1986 album Filigree & Shadow.

Reception

Although released to generally poor reviews at the time (with the aforementioned synthesised drums and bass being the biggest point of contention), Automatic contains "Blues from a Gun", their most successful single in America up to that point, and "Head On" (later covered by Pixies). Critical and fan reception has improved with the passage of time. Pitchfork wrote in 2006 that "conventional wisdom wrongly calls [Automatic] the dud" of the band's discography, but that in hindsight the album "feels like a career peak" and has been a fan favourite.

The last two tracks, "Drop" and "Sunray", do not appear on vinyl LP versions of the album.

Track listing
All tracks written by Jim Reid and William Reid.

LP (BYN 20), limited gatefold LP (BYN 20W) and cassette (BYNC 20)

Side one
 "Here Comes Alice" – 3:53
 "Coast to Coast" – 4:13
 "Blues from a Gun" – 4:44
 "Between Planets" – 3:27
 "UV Ray" – 4:06

Side two
 "Her Way of Praying" – 3:46
 "Head On" – 4:11
 "Take It" – 4:34
 "Halfway to Crazy" – 3:40
 "Gimme Hell" – 3:20

CD (BYNCD 20)
 "Here Comes Alice" – 3:53
 "Coast to Coast" – 4:13
 "Blues from a Gun" – 4:44
 "Between Planets" – 3:27
 "UV Ray" – 4:06
 "Her Way of Praying" – 3:46
 "Head On" – 4:11
 "Take It" – 4:34
 "Halfway to Crazy" – 3:40
 "Gimme Hell" – 3:20
 "Drop" – 1:58
 "Sunray" – 1:34

Personnel

The Jesus and Mary Chain
 Jim Reid – vocals (tracks 2, 4–10), guitar, synthesiser, drum programming, production
 William Reid – vocals (tracks 1, 3, 11), guitar, synthesizer, drum programming, production

Additional personnel
 Alan Moulder – engineering
 Jamie Harley – recording assistance
 Lee Curle – recording assistance
 Dick Meaney – mixing assistance
 Richard Thomas – drums on "Gimme Hell"
 Ryan Art – design
 Steve Mitchell – photography
 Andrew Catlin – photography

Charts

As of May 1998, the album had sold 60,000 copies in the United States, according to Nielsen SoundScan.

References

1989 albums
Blanco y Negro Records albums
The Jesus and Mary Chain albums